Edward J. LaForge (November 22, 1935 – January 19, 2018) was an American politician.

LaForge was born in Pontiac, Michigan. He received his associate degree in nursing from the Kalamazoo Valley Community College. LaForge also went to Western Michigan University and the Bronson Hospital School of Nursing. He also worked as a plumber. He also served in the Michigan National Air Guard from 1954 to 1960.

Political career 
LaForge moved to Kalamazoo from Portage, Michigan, and served ten years as a Kalamazoo City Commissioner. He was a member of the Michigan House of Representatives from the 60th district between 1994 and 2000. He stepped down due to term limits and launched an unsuccessful campaign for the state senate in 2002.

Death
LaForge had been suffering from heart disease and died on January 19, 2018, at his home in Lawton, Michigan, at the age of 82.

References

1935 births
2018 deaths
People from Kalamazoo, Michigan
Politicians from Pontiac, Michigan
People from Van Buren County, Michigan
Military personnel from Michigan
Western Michigan University alumni
American plumbers
American nurses
Michigan city council members
Democratic Party members of the Michigan House of Representatives
20th-century American politicians